Saint Leontius of Monemvasia or Saint Leontius of Achaia, was an Eastern Orthodox Saint who was born in Monemvasia and lived in asceticism in the region of north Peloponnese in the 15th century.
Details about his life are known to us mainly from his first biographer who according to some scholars is the Byzantine philosopher and Ecumenical Patriarch of Constantinople, Gennadius Scholarius. The biography entitled in Greek "Ἐγκώμιον τοῦ ὁσίου Λεοντίου τοῦ ἐν Ἀχαΐᾳ, οὗ ἡ μνήμη τελεῖται τῇ ια´ τοῦ Δεκεμβρίου μηνός" is found in the manuscript Gr. II, 186 (=1180) of the Biblioteca Marciana.

Saint Leontios was born in Monemvasia in 1377, into an aristocratic family. His mother Theodora was a daughter of the emperor Andronikos II Palaiologos and his father Andrew was the governor of the Peloponnese. He was sent to Constantinople for advanced studies in Philosophy and Science. He returned to Monemvasia and later he became a monk. He visited Mount Athos and stayed for some time living an ascetic life. It was revealed to him that he should go to north Peloponnese to a specific area close to the modern city of Aigio, in Achaea region. After his arrival near the Klokos Mountain he built a small church dedicated to the holy Archangels and he lived in a very inaccessible place continuing his ascetic life.
With the support of his uncles Thomas Palaiologos and Demetrios Paleologos - who were impressed by the saintliness of their nephew's life - he established the monastery of the Archangels Michael and Gabriel (known as the Monastery of Pammegiston Taxiarchon). The Palaeologos family donated relics of Saints to the monastery the most important of them being associated with the Holy Passion of the Lord (small portions of the Holy Cross, the Crown of Thorns, the Sponge, and the Purple Robe of the Lord). 
Today the Honorable Body of Saint Leontios is kept in a special shrine in the church of the Holy Archangels, inside the monastery. There is a church in his name in the town of Aigio, and another in Monemvasia.

Gallery

References

Greek saints of the Eastern Orthodox Church
Greek Christian monks
15th-century Christian saints
1377 births
1452 deaths
People associated with Mount Athos
Christian ascetics
People from Laconia